Sierra de Utiel is a  long mountain range in the Alt Palància, Alt Millars and Plana Baixa comarcas, Valencian Community, Spain. Its highest point is the 1,306 m high El Remedio. There is often snow in the winter.

Minor ranges
There are four ranges running parallel to each other:
Sierra del Negrete, also known as Sierra del Remedio, the main range, with the 1,306 m high El Remedio, where there is a shrine and the Cerrochico (1,223 m). 
The  Sierra de Utiel proper with the 1,112 m high Cabeza del Fraile
The Sierra de Juan Navarro with the 1,177 m high Cinco Pinos, the Juan Navarro (1,167 m) and the Ropé (1,140 m), where both former ranges merge to meet the tectonic depression of Chera.
The Sierra de la Atalaya, whose highest summit is  La Atalaya (1,157 m).

The Utiel Range has been declared a Site of Community Importance (SCI).

See also
Mountains of the Valencian Community

References

External links
Red de senderos de la Plana de Utiel - Sierras de Utiel y del Negrete
Parcs Naturals de la Comunitat Valenciana - Official List

Utiel
Requena-Utiel
Los Serranos